The Philadelphia Wings are a lacrosse team based in Philadelphia, Pennsylvania playing in the National Lacrosse League (NLL). The 2009 season was the 23rd in franchise history.

Regular season

Conference standings

Game log
Reference:

Player stats
Reference:

Runners (Top 10)

Note: GP = Games played; G = Goals; A = Assists; Pts = Points; LB = Loose balls; PIM = Penalty minutes

Goaltenders
Note: GP = Games played; MIN = Minutes; W = Wins; L = Losses; GA = Goals against; Sv% = Save percentage; GAA = Goals against average

Transactions

Players not returning
 Jake Bergey – lost in the 2008 expansion draft
 Johnny Christmas – taking the year to focus on work with a lacrosse non-profit organization 
 Jason Crosbie – lost to free agency (Toronto)
 Peter Jacobs – retired
 Jay Preece – lost to free agency (Colorado)
 Jamie Rooney – lost in the 2008 dispersal draft

Entry draft
The 2008 NLL Entry Draft took place on September 7, 2008. The Wings selected the following players:

Roster

See also
2009 NLL season

References

Philadelphia
Philly